Mesosa kaloensis is a species of beetle in the family Cerambycidae. It was described by Stephan von Breuning in 1938. It is known from Sulawesi.

References

kaloensis
Beetles described in 1938